Mount St. Louis Moonstone is a southern Ontario ski resort located north of Barrie. The resort is just over one hour driving time from Toronto and is located just off Highway 400. Although the hill itself is fairly small, it has been extensively built out, with four high-speed six-pack lifts against a total of nine Chairlifts and three Surface lifts.

History

In 1956 Josl Huter, a skier who had formerly competed in the Austrian National Alpine Championships, emigrated to Toronto from Austria to start a career in the automotive industry. He returned to the ski industry again the next year almost by accident, after meeting a friend who worked at the Limberlost Resort outside of Huntsville, Ontario who asked Huter to fill in for a sick instructor. Huter was diagnosed with a small brain tumour which was removed in January 1958, but returned to the industry the following year. During the summer he returned to Austria and married, working in a small inn there during the summer, and as a ski instructor in Canada in the winter, now at Muskoka Sands Resort.

In the spring of 1963 he was offered a manager position at Horseshoe Valley Ski Resort just north of Barrie, but when this position did not pan out a friend mentioned that there was another potential resort location nearby. They sold their Austrian inn and purchased the land in the fall of 1963, starting work cutting the trails that December. Bulldozers were used to clear out additional brush and rocks in May 1964, and two  were added late that fall.

Mount St. Louis first opened for business on December 16, 1964. The weather did not cooperate, and all the snow melted off four days later, so local high-school students were hired to carry snow from the surrounding bush and dump it on the trail in an effort to keep it open. This sort of thaw proved to be common, not entirely surprising given the south-east facing slopes. To address this problem, the first snowmaking system was installed in 1966. The hill rapidly expanded over the next few years. Additional runs were added in 1967 and 68, along with a new triple chair, Canada's first, in 1969. New trails were added in 1971, and a new double chair was added to serve them the next year.

Through the 1970s a number of new resorts in the Collingwood area offered higher verticals, and started to draw business away from Mount St.Louis. By the time construction was completed in 1979,  had been moved, giving the hill its current  vertical.

Throughout this period a second hill was developing only a few hundred metres to the north, Moonstone. In 1983 they had installed Canada's first quad chair on their longest trail.

The next year the original T-bars on Mt. St. Louis were replaced by a new quad, giving the combined Mt. St. Louis Moonstone the largest uphill capacity in Ontario (at the time). Moonstone was again raised, this time to 500 ft. In 1989 the Mt. St. Louis peak was again expanded with another  of dirt, and a high-speed quad was added to service it, replacing the earlier triple. The next major expansion was in 1996, when another  was added to Moonstone, and one of Moonstone's quads was replaced with a high-speed six-pack. In 2007 another high speed six-pack was added to Mt. St Louis, replacing one triple and one double chair.

In the summer of 2013, the first set of lights were added to some trails for night skiing starting the next season.

See also
 Blue Mountain
 Horseshoe Resort
 Beaver Valley
 List of ski areas and resorts in Canada

References

External links

 

Ski areas and resorts in Ontario